Quentin Tremaine Jammer (born June 19, 1979) is an American former professional football player who was a cornerback in the National Football League (NFL). He played college football for the University of Texas, and earned All-American honors. He was drafted by the San Diego Chargers in the first round of the 2002 NFL Draft and he played for them for eleven seasons.

Early years 
Jammer was born in Bay City, Texas, and attended Angleton High School.  In high school football, he was a two-time all-district safety, cornerback, linebacker, wide receiver, and quarterback as a senior, and was the district's defensive most valuable player.  He also won three letters in track and field, and participated in the long jump, 100-meter dash, and the 200-meter dash. In 1997, he was selected for the state all-star football team, which included future San Diego Chargers teammates LaDainian Tomlinson and Drew Brees.

College career 
Jammer attended the University of Texas at Austin, and played for coach Mack Brown's Texas Longhorns football team from 1997 to 2001.  He was a first-team All-Big 12 Conference selection following his junior and senior seasons, and was recognized as a unanimous first-team All-American as a senior in 2001.  He was named team co-MVP his senior year and recorded seven interceptions as well as 195 tackles throughout his collegiate career.

Professional career

2002 NFL Draft 
Jammer was drafted by the San Diego Chargers with the fifth overall pick in the first round of the 2002 NFL Draft.

San Diego Chargers 
Due to a holdout to start the 2002 season, Jammer was not ready to make an impact his rookie year and started only four games. The following year, in 2003, Jammer started at the cornerback position. Coming into the NFL, Jammer was touted as being a physical player rather than a finesse cover cornerback. The transition to the NFL was difficult because the physical style of play that brought him so much success in college often resulted in pass interference calls. Jammer led the NFL in pass interference calls in 2004 with eight. Jammer suffered another setback in his development when the NFL made an officiating point of emphasis in 2004 that penalized defensive players for touching receivers further than five yards past the line of scrimmage. In an interview with Rick Gosselin of The Dallas Morning News, Jammer said, "All the rule changes for the offense have altered the game. It's turned football into track with pads. Before you know it, the receivers are going to have a free run at you. You can't touch them at all. The rules got me away from my game," Jammer said. "When physical corners start finessing it, that's not their style."

Jammer has also been criticized for his lack of interceptions.  In 62 career games leading up to the 2006 season, Jammer had only recorded six interceptions, including just two total in the 2004 and 2005 seasons.  When the Chargers extended Jammer's contract during the 2006 offseason, Kevin Acee of the San Diego Union Tribune wrote that "... he is widely considered by Chargers fans to be among the team's weak links, mostly for the fact he has just six career interceptions."  Acee later wrote of Jammer: "In recent seasons Jammer has been without a doubt the most vilified Charger. It was difficult to tell whether he was disliked (perhaps too mild a term) more for what he did (get called for a lot of penalties) or what he didn't do (make interceptions). It's possible in the past decade there has been only one other Charger (do we really need to say his name?) who drew more wrath from the faithful."

During Jammer's first four years with the Chargers, the team regularly finished at or near the bottom of the league in terms of pass defense.  Except for the 2003 season, the team was in the bottom five in terms of pass defense every year from 2002 to 2005.  This led many Charger fans to become frustrated with Jammer, as due to his high draft position he became a symbol for the Chargers' failure to assemble a solid secondary. In turn, Jammer was often at odds with fans over their criticisms.  In a September 2005 interview, Jammer said of the fans: "Those people are idiots. (They) don't know anything about football...They're not going to bother me." Many fans could often be heard chanting, "Lito, Lito" every time Jammer was beaten by a receiver, a reference to Lito Sheppard, the two-time Pro-Bowl cornerback of the Philadelphia Eagles who was taken after Jammer in the 2002 draft.

In recent years, supporters of Jammer noted that the Chargers had a poor pass defense not because of Jammer, but because of their anemic pass rush.  But in 2005, the Chargers had one of the top front 7s in the NFL, featuring Pro Bowler and NFL Defensive Rookie of the Year Award winner Shawne Merriman and Pro Bowler Jamal Williams.  Despite this fearsome pass rush, the Chargers still finished 28th in the league in pass defense.  A reason for this may be that the 3-4 defense, which the Chargers use under Ted Cottrell, typically has larger, slower players in the front seven than in the respective positions in the 4-3, leaving more pressure on the defensive backs.

During training camp he signed a new five-year contract extension that ran through the 2012 season. The 2006 offseason saw an overhaul of the Chargers' secondary after many disappointing years.  The team signed former Carolina Panthers safety Marlon McCree as a free agent, and they spent a first-round draft choice on cornerback Antonio Cromartie.  McCree's veteran presence had an immediate impact on the secondary, including Jammer, who surpassed his 2005 interception total in only the third game of the season.  Although Jammer only recorded one more interception in the remaining 13 games, the 2006 season was his best and most consistent as a pro. Towards the middle of the season, Jammer showed signs of turning into a shutdown cornerback, and QBs rarely threw at him. He closed out the Chargers 21-14 win over Oakland on November 26 with an interception on the first play after the two-minute warning. He finished the season leading the team in interceptions with 4 and with a career-high in tackles helping the Chargers finished 13th in the league in pass defense.

Jammer critics point to the 3rd and 10, long bomb Reche Caldwell caught in the divisional playoff game against the New England Patriots as a sign that Jammer was still not meeting expectations.  Jammer, in blitz-scheme, short area press coverage, was not able to help the defense recover from an ineffective jailhouse blitz and Patriots' quarterback Tom Brady comfortably stepped up in the pocket to loft a deep strike to Caldwell.  Despite Brady's completion to Caldwell, Jammer had a strong day limiting Patriot receivers, in the 2007 AFC Championship game against the Patriots, he had an outstanding performance, limiting Randy Moss to 1 reception for 12 yards, and intercepting Tom Brady once.

In week 6 of the 2012 season, Jammer recorded his first interception returned for a touchdown in his career on a pass from Denver Broncos quarterback Peyton Manning.

Denver Broncos 
On May 29, 2013, Jammer signed with the Denver Broncos. He became a free agent in March 2014 after one season with the Broncos.

Television & Media 
Quentin Jammer made an appearance on an episode of "E! True Hollywood Story" in 2009. Jammer appeared as himself in Season 13 episode 20, which originally aired on November 18, 2009.

NFL career statistics

Personal life 
Quentin has three sons.  His cousins are former NFL players Johnnie Lee Higgins, Cedric Woodard and Darren Woodard. His half-brother is NFL player Quandre Diggs.

See also
List of Texas Longhorns football All-Americans
List of Los Angeles Chargers first-round draft picks

References

External links

 Denver Broncos bio
 Quentin Jammer profile at San Diego Chargers
 Quentin Jammer Career Stats

1979 births
Living people
Angleton High School alumni
All-American college football players
American football cornerbacks
American football safeties
Denver Broncos players
People from Houston
People from Angleton, Texas
San Diego Chargers players
Texas Longhorns football players
People from Bay City, Texas
Ed Block Courage Award recipients